Calvin Smith may refer to:

Calvin Smith (born 1961), sprinter
Calvin Smith Jr. (born 1987), sprinter
Calvin Smith (Illinois politician) (1907–1968), pharmacist and Illinois state legislator
Calvin Smith (Michigan politician) (died 1838), American politician and lawyer